Peter Läng (born 16 April 1986) is a former professional footballer. Born in Switzerland, he represented Thailand at international level.

Personal life
Läng was born in Zürich. His father is Swiss and his mother is Thai.

International career
Läng was called up to the full Thailand national side in coach Peter Reid's first squad announcement in the friendly match against Liverpool in July 2009.

International

Honours
Bangkok Glass
 Queen's Cup: 2010
 Singapore Cup: 2010

References

External links
 
 Profile at Goal.com

1986 births
Living people
Footballers from Zürich
Peter Lang
Swiss people of Thai descent
Swiss men's footballers
Peter Lang
Association football midfielders
FC Schaffhausen players
Peter Lang
Swiss Challenge League players
Peter Lang
Switzerland under-21 international footballers
Switzerland youth international footballers
Peter Lang